The Red Eagle is a 2010 Thai vigilante-superhero film directed and written by Wisit Sasanatieng.

Plot
In the year 2013 in Bangkok, the Liberal Party leader Direk Damrongprapa (Pornwut Sarasin) campaigns during an election on an anti-corruption platform with the support of his fiancée Vasana Tienpradap (Yarinda Bunnag), a Harvard University educated geology expert. Three years later Vasana separates herself from Direk who has become the prime minister over his betrayal in refusing to stop construction of the Chumporn nuclear power plant. Meanwhile, a masked vigilante known as Red Eagle (Ananda Everingham) emerges within the city. Red Eagle is actually Rom Rittikrai, a former Thai Special Force agent who had been rescued by Vasana when escaping from an attack by the Matulee (a secret society that hires masked assassin Black Devil to murder Red Eagle) and got a bullet in the brain; his terrible headaches can only be relieved by regular dose of morphine. Red Eagles has dispatched drug-dealers while a CSD Agent former Royal Thai Special Force Detective Chart Wuttikrai (Wannasingh Prasertkul) and his Sikh colleague Singh (Jonathan Hallman) are ordered to track down Red Eagle. Red Eagle kills the parliamentary member Sonkuan who is a child pornographer. This leads him to become the no. 1 target of the Matulee. Vasana recognises that Red Eagle and Rome are the same man, igniting an attraction between them. Meanwhile, Chart and the Matalee continue to hunt Red Eagle down.

Production
Ananda Everingham stars as the Red Eagle. The character was originally played by Mitr Chaibancha who died shooting the last scene in the 1960s film series of the same name. 
Everingham said that "if you know anything about the history of the film, well, you can understand that the role felt like it was big shoes to fill." The character was changed from being an alcoholic in the original series to being addicted to morphine in the new film.

Cast
 Ananda Everingham as Rome Rittikrai/The Red Eagle
 Yarinda Bunnag as Vasana Tienpradap
 Pornwut Sarasin as Prime Minister Direk Damrongprapa
 Jonathan Hallman as Singh and Black Devil
 Wannasingh Prasertkul as Detective Chart Wuttikrai
 Pattanadesh Asasappakij

Release
The Red Eagle had its world premiere in Bangkok on October 4, 2010.
The Red Eagle was released in Thailand on October 7, 2010. The film had its international premiere at the 15th Busan International Film Festival on October 10. The Red Eagle'''s Thai box office returns have been described as "underperformed" and "disappointing".

ReceptionThe Red Eagle received generally negative reception from English language critics on its release. Film Business Asia gave the film a rating of three out of ten and called the film a "repetitive mess", stating "the main problem is the raggy script - a consistent problem with Sasanatieng's movies - and style-less, hand-held direction". The Hollywood Reporter has mixed feelings on the action scenes in the film, but called the choreography not "particularly creative". The review suggested if the project was made by directors Prachya Pinkaew and Panna Rittikrai that "it would have tighter action and more cinematic panache". Variety gave the film a negative review, calling the film overlong and noting that "aside from a few eye-catching setpieces, there's little excitement or cinematic flair on display." Both Variety'' and Film Business Asia critiqued the soundtrack calling it "Ear-splitting" and "the most deafening music track in memory" respectively.

References

External links
 

2010 films
Thai-language films
2010 action films
2010s superhero films
Thai action films
Thai superhero films